The Facts of Life is a book published in 1953 by C. D. Darlington of the subject of race, heredity and evolution. Darlington was a major contributor to the field of genetics around the time of the modern synthesis.

References

1953 non-fiction books
Biology books
Modern synthesis (20th century)